Honest is a 1991 album by Dave Stewart and the Spiritual Cowboys. It was Stewart's second and final album with the Pretenders' Martin Chambers after Annie Lennox left the Eurythmics to start a family.

Track listing
All tracks composed by Dave Stewart; except where indicated
"Honest"
"Whole Wide World"
"Crown of Madness"
"Out of Reach" (music: Nan Vernon)
"You're Lost"
"Fools Paradise"
"Motorcycle Mystics"
"Impossible"
"Here We Go Again"
"Here She Comes"
"Fade Away" (music and lyrics: Jonathan Perkins)
"Cat with a Tale"
"R.U. Satisfied"

Personnel
Dave Stewart — lead vocals, guitar
Nan Vernon — backing vocals, guitar
John Turnbull — guitar, backing vocals
Jonathan Perkins — keyboards, backing vocals
Chris Bostock — bass, backing vocals
Martin Chambers — drums, backing vocals
Olle Romo — drums, drum programming
with:
Shankar — violin on "You're Lost"
Ruby Zimmermoon — harmonica on "Here She Comes"
Beverlei Brown, Carol Kenyon, Pamela Beckford, Valerie Chalmers — backing vocals on "R.U. Satisfied"
Technical
Manu Guiot — engineer, mixing
Alan Moulder — mixing on "Fools Paradise"

References

1991 albums
Albums produced by David A. Stewart